The impulse for creation of centres of technical training came from the British rulers of India, and it arose out of the necessity for the training of overseers for construction and maintenance of public buildings, roads, canals, and ports, and for the training of artisans and craftsmen for the use of instruments, and apparatus needed for the army, the navy, and the survey department. While superintending engineers were mostly recruited from Britain, lower grade craftsmen, artisans and sub-overseers were recruited locally. The necessity to make them more efficient, led to the establishment of industrial schools attached to the Ordnance Factories Board and other engineering establishments.

History

The first engineering college was established in present day Uttarakhand at Roorkee in the year 1847 for the training of Civil Engineers. Thomason College of Civil Engineering as it was called, made use of the large workshops and public buildings there that were erected for the Upper Ganges Canal. The college was converted to the University of Roorkee in 1948 and upgraded to the Indian Institute of Technology, Roorkee in 2001.

In July 1854, College of Engineering, Pune's precursor, The Poona Engineering Class and Mechanical School was opened, with an aim to provide suitable learning to the subordinate officers in the Public Works Department. In June 1865 Mr. Theodore Cooke, M.A, who held that appointment for 28 years was appointed Principal. The foundation stone of the new college was laid by the Governor, Sir Bartle Frere, on 5 August 1865. College was affiliated to University of Bombay in 1866. In 1868 the College moved to the New Buildings. The college was divided into three departments for matriculated and unmatriculated students. In 1879 two new classes, an Agricultural class and a Forest class, were added to the college, and the name of the college was changed from " The Poona Civil Engineering College " to " The College of Science". The credit for most of the civil infrastructure in India goes to the alumni of COEP, including Bharat Ratna Sir M. Visvesvarayya, in whose honor "Engineers Day" is celebrated.

In pursuance of the Government policy, three Engineering Colleges were opened by about 1856 in the three Presidencies.

In Bengal, a College called the Calcutta Civil Engineering College was opened at the Writers' Buildings in November 1856. With the establishment of University of Calcutta on 24 January 1857, the college was affiliated to this university since May 1857.  In 1865, the college merged with Presidency College, Kolkata and from 1865 to 1869 the college functioned as the Civil Engineering Department of Presidency College. In 1880, the college was shifted to its present campus at Shibpur, Howrah, and was christened the Government College, Howrah, in the premises of Bishop's College. On 12 February 1920 the name was changed to Bengal Engineering College, Shibpur. The word Shibpur was deleted on 24 March 1921 and it became Bengal Engineering College. The college was subsequently rechristened Bengal Engineering and Science University and upgraded to the Indian Institute of Engineering Science and Technology, Shibpur in 2014. Also in March 27, 1914 University of Calcutta established their own science and technology campus, came to be known as Rajabazar Science College. This institute has some of the oldest applied science departments.

In the Madras Presidency, the industrial school attached to the Gun Carriage Factory became ultimately the College of Engineering, Guindy. It was founded in 1794 as Asia's oldest technical institution and was affiliated to the University of Madras in 1858.

The Banaras Engineering College was established at Varanasi in the year 1919. The college was rechristened as the Institute of Technology, Banaras Hindu University in 1968. The college was upgraded to the Indian Institute of Technology (Banaras Hindu University), Varanasi in 2012.

The British also opened Harcourt Butler Technological Institute, Kanpur for chemical sciences in 1921 in the United Provinces, now Uttar Pradesh. it is now called the Harcourt Butler Technical University.

Indian School of Mines, Dhanbad was established by British Indian Government on the lines of the Royal School of Mines, London, and was formally opened on 9 December 1926 by Lord Irwin, the then Viceroy of India. The college was subsequently called the Indian School of Mines University for a while before the word University was dropped from its name. The college was upgraded to the Indian Institute of Technology (Indian School of Mines), Dhanbad in 2016.

In 1947 when India became independent, there were 36 institutions for first-degree engineering education, with an annual intake of about 2500 students.

List

See also

 Engineering education in India
 History of science and technology in the Indian subcontinent
 Information technology in India
 List of Indian inventions
 Science and technology in India
 Science and technology studies in India
 Timeline of Indian innovation

References

Notes
 Have been upgraded to Indian Institutes of Technology.
 Raised to degree standard (college/university).

Citations 

Engineering education in India
Lists of engineering colleges in India